Liu Xinwu (born June 1942) is a Chinese author, and one of the earliest proponents of the post-Maoist wave of Chinese literature.

Biography
Born in the province of Sichuan, his family moved to Beijing, a city that figures prominently in his work, in 1950. Liu spent most of his life in Beijing, except for a brief period during the Cultural Revolution, when he was sent to work in rural China.

His short story, "Class counsellor" (also translated as "The Class Teacher") published in 1977 was one of the earliest examples of prose condemning the excesses of the Chinese government during the Cultural Revolution. His work has sometimes been referred to as scar literature, though this assessment is disputed.

Liu filled editorial positions in a number of prominent government-sponsored publications throughout most of the 1980s. In 1987, however, he was removed as editor of the publication People's Literature after a story published failed to meet government approval. He left all his government positions after the Tiananmen Square protests of 1989 because of continual harassment from the government for his pro-demonstrator stance. Since then, he has devoted himself entirely to his writing.

Liu's work, which includes novels, short stories, and children's literature, focuses on the common people of Beijing and people who live on the margins of society.

Redology
Since the early 1990s Liu has also been engaging in Redology, also known as studies of the famous 18th-century Chinese novel Dream of the Red Chamber. Liu takes on the controversial stance that in studying this famous Qing novel, the researcher's point of departure should be the figure of Qin Keqing, thus authoring the branch of Qin studies within redology. In 2006 Liu gave a talk at Columbia University introducing this concept. Liu has also published on The Dream with the famous redologist Zhou Ruchang.

Translations
 Black Walls and Other Stories (ed. by Don J. Cohn)
 Chinese short stories of the twentieth century: an anthology in English (ed. by Zhihua Fang) Includes "The Class Teacher".
 Prize-winning Stories from China, 1978-1979 (by Liu Xinwu, Wang Meng, and others). HC PB (Includes "The Teacher") Available to borrow at archive.org 
 The Wedding Party (translated by Jeremy Tiang). HC PB
 The Wounded: new stories of the Cultural Revolution, 77-78 (ed, Hsin-hua Lu, Geremie Barmé, Bennett Lee). HC PB Includes "Class counsellor".

References

1942 births
Living people
Chinese male short story writers
Writers from Chengdu
Mao Dun Literature Prize laureates
Chinese male novelists
Chinese children's writers
20th-century Chinese short story writers
20th-century Chinese male writers
People's Republic of China short story writers
Short story writers from Sichuan
Redologists